Harold "Hal" Goldman (December 5, 1919 – June 27, 2001) was an American Emmy Award-winning screenwriter, television director.

References

External links

American male screenwriters
American television directors
Primetime Emmy Award winners
1919 births
2001 deaths
Writers from Saint Paul, Minnesota
Screenwriters from Minnesota
20th-century American male writers
20th-century American screenwriters